In Shinto faith, Kuninotokotachi   is one of the two gods born from "something like a reed that arose from the soil" when the Earth was chaotic. In the Nihon Shoki, he is the first of the first three divinities born after Heaven and Earth were born out of chaos, and is born from something looking like a reed-shoot growing between heaven and earth. He is known by mythology to reside on top of Mount Fuji (富士山).

Kuninotokotachi is described as a hitorigami and genderless in Kojiki, but is described as a male god in Nihon Shoki.

Yoshida Kanetomo, the founder of the Yoshida Shintō sect, identified Kuninotokotachi with Amenominakanushi and regarded him as the primordial god of the Universe.

See also
Kamiyonanayo

References

External links
Encyclopedia of Shinto - http://eos.kokugakuin.ac.jp
Kunitokotachi on the Japanese History Database.

Shinto kami
Androgynous and hermaphroditic deities
Amatsukami